Maaraba may refer to:

 Maaraba, Rif Dimashq
 Maaraba, Daraa